The Graphic Communications Conference (GCC) is an International Brotherhood of Teamsters affiliated union which represents more than 60,000 workers in all craft and skill areas in the printing and publishing industry.

Composition

According to GCC's Department of Labor records since 2006, when membership classifications were first reported, the "active" membership of the union has fallen from 60% to 45%. The other—now 55%—half of the union's membership are classified as "honorary," and are described as retirees who pay no dues and are ineligible to vote in the union. GCC contracts also cover some non-members, known as agency fee payers, which since 2006 have numbered comparatively less than a percent of the size of the union's membership, or about 100 non-members paying agency fees.

History
The conference was created after the Graphic Communications International Union (GCIU) voted to join forces with Teamsters in late 2004.

The merger enables the now-stronger Teamsters Union to represent even more workers in printing and related industries. For example, the GCC and the Teamsters Newspaper Division represent different but complementary types of employees at many major newspapers, such as the Cleveland Plain Dealer, The Boston Globe, Boston Herald, The Columbus Dispatch and The Star-Ledger in New Jersey.

The Graphic Communications Conference of the International Brotherhood of Teamsters, Local 767M is the successor union of several merged printers' locals spanning back into the late 1800s. The local unions have been affiliated with different international unions over time.

See also
 Santa Barbara News-Press controversy

References

Archives
 Graphic Communications International Union, Local 767M records. 1908-2009. 15.38 cubic feet (16 boxes). At the Labor Archives of Washington, University of Washington Libraries Special Collections.

International Brotherhood of Teamsters
Trade unions in the United States
Organizations based in Washington, D.C.
Trade unions established in 2005